Saxman (Lingít: T’èesh Ḵwáan Xagu) is a town on Revillagigedo Island in Ketchikan Gateway Borough in southeastern Alaska, United States. At the 2010 census the population was 411, down from 431 in 2000. The city of Ketchikan lies just to its northwest.

Geography
Saxman is located at  (55.320557, -131.598364).

Demographics

Saxman first appeared on the 1900 U.S. Census as an unincorporated village. It formally incorporated in 1929.

As of the census of 2000, there were 431 people, 127 households, and 90 families residing in the city. The racial makeup of the city was 28.07% White, 0.46% Black or African American, 66.13% Native American, 0.46% Asian, 0.23% Pacific Islander, and 4.64% from two or more races.  2.32% of the population were Hispanic or Latino of any race.

There were 127 households, out of which 35.4% had children under the age of 18 living with them, 44.1% were married couples living together, 21.3% had a female householder with no husband present, and 29.1% were non-families. 20.5% of all households were made up of individuals, and 6.3% had someone living alone who was 65 years of age or older.  The average household size was 3.13 and the average family size was 3.57.

In the city, the age distribution of the population shows 27.4% under the age of 18, 15.8% from 18 to 24, 26.2% from 25 to 44, 23.2% from 45 to 64, and 7.4% who were 65 years of age or older.  The median age was 32 years. For every 100 females, there were 130.5 males.  For every 100 females age 18 and over, there were 133.6 males.

The median income for a household in the city was $44,375, and the median income for a family was $45,417. Males had a median income of $35,139 versus $37,500 for females. The per capita income for the city was $15,642.  About 7.4% of families and 12.1% of the population were below the poverty line, including 20.4% of those under age 18 and 6.3% of those age 65 or over.

Trivia
Saxman is one of the totem capitals of Alaska.

References

Cities in Alaska
Cities in Ketchikan Gateway Borough, Alaska
Populated coastal places in Alaska on the Pacific Ocean
Tlingit